Roche railway station serves the village of Roche in Cornwall, England. The station is managed and served by Great Western Railway local trains.

History
The Cornwall Minerals Railway opened its line from Fowey to Newquay on 1 June 1874.  The trains at first carried only goods traffic and a depot was provided at Holywell.  A passenger service was introduced on 20 June 1876 when the depot was renamed "Victoria", which gave its name to the modern hamlet on the site, and then changed to "Roche" on 1 May 1904.

The passing loop was extended on 3 July 1936 to accommodate the longer holiday trains then using the line.  It was closed on 3 January 1965 when the goods yard was closed.  For a while trains used the old westbound platform but on 12 July 1965 this was changed to the eastbound platform and the westbound track was then removed.

Services
Roche is a request stop on the line, so passengers wishing to alight must inform the conductor and passengers wishing to join the train must signal to the driver. The typical service is one train every two hours in each direction between Par and Newquay, with some services extending to Plymouth and one train in the summer extending to Penzance. On summer Saturdays, there is just one train per day in each direction due to the intercity services running through to Newquay in lieu of the local services. Trains are usually operated by Class 150 Sprinters.

Community rail
The trains between Par and Newquay are designated as a community rail service and is supported by marketing provided by the Devon and Cornwall Rail Partnership.  The line is promoted under the "Atlantic Coast Line" name.

The Victoria Inn at Roche is part of the Atlantic Coast Line rail ale trail.

References

 
 
 

Railway stations in Cornwall
Former Great Western Railway stations
Railway stations in Great Britain opened in 1876
Railway stations served by Great Western Railway
Railway request stops in Great Britain
DfT Category F2 stations